is a Japanese singer and composer. As of 1987, he had sold 20 million singles and 4 million LP albums.

Itsuki is usually regarded as an enka singer, but he has also released a cover version of Southern All Stars' J-pop song "Tsunami".

Career
In 1965, Itsuki debuted under the stage name "Masaru Matsuyama," but did not initially achieve commercial success. Although he changed his stage name to "Eiichi Ichijō" in 1967, and then to "Ken Mitani" in 1969, there was no improvement in his music's commercial sales. In 1971, he changed his name to "Hiroshi Itsuki" and was given the song  by Masaaki Hirao. Written by lyricist Yoko Yamaguchi, "Yokohama Tasogare" reached the top of the Oricon weekly single chart.

His 2006 single "Takasebune" debuted at number 9 on the Oricon charts, becoming his first Top 10 single in 22 years, since his 1984 single "Nagaragawa Enka".  In 2008, he was featured in Morning Musume's Cover You album. He sang "Izakaya" with Ai Takahashi. Also in 2008, he collaborated with the girl group Cute, letting them record the song "Edo no Temari Uta", he himself was planning to include in his end-of-year album. Cute's producer Tsunku liked the song and thought that if performed by girls the enka lyrics will sound like "a modern fairytale". In what was called a collaboration by Tsunku and a rivalry between two performers by Sankei Sports, they both released the song as CD singles, Cute on July 30, and Itsuki as his 132nd single on October 22. Cute's version, entitled "Edo no Temari Uta II", was nominated for the main Japan Record Award of 2008, which also meant receiving a Gold Award from the Japan Composer's Association.

Discography

Top 10 singles

{| class="wikitable"
|-
!#||Title||Date/Position
|-
||1||align="left"|Debut single||align="right"|1971 (#1)
|-
|2||align="left"|||align="right"|1971 (#4)
|-
|3||align="left"|||align="right"|1972 (#6)
|-
|4||align="left"|||align="right"|1972 (#5)
|-
|5||align="left"|||align="right"|1973 (#4)
|-
|6||align="left"|||align="right"|1974 (#5)
|-
|7||align="left"|||align="right"|1974 (#6)
|-
|8||align="left"|'||align="right"|1975(#10)
|-
|9||align="left"|||align="right"|1975 (#6)
|-
|10||align="left"|||align="right"|1976 (#10)
|-
|11||align="left"|||align="right"|1979 (#3)
|-
|12||align="left"|||align="right"|1980 (#4)
|-
|13||align="left"|||align="right"|1980 (#10)
|-
|14||align="left"|||align="right"|1983 (#9)
|-
|15||align="left"|||align="right"|1984 (#10)
|-
|16||align="left"|||align="right"|2006 (#9)
|}

HonoursJapan Record AwardsGrand Prize: 2 times 
Best Singing Award: 3 times 
Singing Award: 5 times 
Gold award: 10 times 
Composition Award: 1 time 
Best Album Award: 1 time
Planning Award: 2 times
Special prize: 2 times
Masao Koga Memorial Award: Once
Misora Hibari Memorial Award: OnceOther Awards'''
Medal with Purple Ribbon (2007)
Order of the Rising Sun, 4th Class, Gold Rays with Rosette (2018)

References

External links 
 
 Official Website 

1948 births
Living people
Japanese male composers
Japanese composers
Japanese male pop singers
Enka singers
Nippon Columbia artists
Musicians from Fukui Prefecture
Tokuma Japan Communications artists
Recipients of the Medal with Purple Ribbon
Recipients of the Order of the Rising Sun, 4th class
Up-Front Group